Seamus McMurphy was an Irish poet and rapparee, 1720-1750.

Early life

He was born at Carnally, Creggan parish, near Crossmaglen, in County Armagh, modern-day Northern Ireland, about 1720. His father's name is unknown although his mother was Aine. A grandfather was said to have been killed at the Battle of Aughrim in 1691 (see Diarmuid Mac Muireadhaigh). McMurphy had four sisters; one of whom, Aillidh, was married to Mr. Duffy, a nephew of the poet Niall McMurphy to whom he was closely related.

Rapparee
He was noted as a handsome man, and used to introduce himself to his victims by saying, "My name is Seamus Mac Murphy, the handsomest man in Ireland.". He had a reputation as a great drinker and a charming companion of many women. Yet it was alcoholism and promiscuity that were to lead to his downfall.

His close friend was Peadar Ó Doirnín, a fellow-poet with whom he founded a hedge school teaching Irish bardic poetry. They held regular sessions at Dunreavy Wood and Mullaghbane. 

The two were actively involved in the planning for the Jacobite rising of 1745; McMurphy had also been an active rapparee since at least 1740. His main adversary was John Johnston of Roxborough, known as Johnston of the Fews, an infamous local tory- and priest hunter.

In the summer of 1744, Mac Murchaidh and O'Doirnin organised a monster meeting on Slieve Gullion to motivate the local people for the imminent arrival of Prince Charles Edward Stuart. As a result of the unrest caused by the Slieve Gullion meeting, Johnston was attacked and very seriously wounded. Though he survived, he met with McMurphy and Ó Doirnín, where they agreed to "an uneasy truce."

McMurphy and Ó Doirnín often attended a sibín or inn at Flagstaff (or Upper Fathom?), a mountain route to Omeath, owned by Patsy MacDecker, known as Paddy of the Mountain. The area remains particularly remote even in the 21st century, and in the 1740s was the perfect hideaway for rapparees.

McMurphy also took Paddy Mac Decker's daughter, Molly, as his mistress. However, their affair was tempestuous; after a fierce argument and break-up, Molly allegedly swore revenge on Mac Murphy. To this end, she plied Ó Doirnín with drink one evening, and inveigled him to compose a satirical poem about Johnston called The Heretic Headhunter. Molly then showed the poem to Johnston, saying McMurphy was the author. Johnston was angry at this breach of their truce. In return, Molly was offered £50 by Johnson to trap McMurphy.

However, another version lays the blame on a lieutenant of Mac Murchaidh, Art Fearon, who wished to ingratiate himself with Molly. This version claims that he told her in-depth stories about the many infidelities of McMurphy with other women. Equally enraged, Paddy MacDecker decided to collect the £50 already offered as bounty, and joined the scheme. On the Saturday night before the Pattern Day of Killeavy, McMurphy was to spend the night at the inn; the MacDeckers got him insensibly drunk and off-guard.

However it came about, Johnston and his men caught McMurphy at MacDecker's sibín, sometime in late 1749 or early 1750.

Trial and aftermath
McMurphy spent eight months in prison in Newry, County Down, before been tried, found guilty and sentenced to execution. He is said to have had not fear on the day and forgave all who helped his capture, including Molly. His body was left hanging for three days before it was taken down, waked for two nights at his mother's barn in Carnally, before been buried in Creggan churchyard.

Legacy
Paddy MacDecker is said to have received his bounty at Armagh in copper coin, so allegedly disgusted were the authorities with him. Folk legend has it that the effort of carrying the reward twenty miles home caused him to die within sight of his home.

For violating the traditional Irish code of silence regarding both the police and the courts, Molly MacDecker was ostracised by her community, and became mentally ill. She eventually drowned herself at Narrow Water.

In 1973, Jem Murphy, a relation of the rapparee's family, erected a headstone to Seamus McMurphy in Creggan churchyard.

External links
 https://www.orielarts.com/songs/seamus-mac-murfaidh/
 http://creggan.armagh.anglican.org/second.html
 http://creggan.armagh.anglican.org/fourth.html
 http://www.newryjournal.co.uk/content/view/275/31/
 http://creggan1.tripod.com/CregGui2a.htm
 https://docs.google.com/viewer?a=v&pid=sites&srcid=ZGVmYXVsdGRvbWFpbnxnYXBvdGhlbm9ydGh8Z3g6NTdlMmYwMzE4ZTNkYmYzNw

Irish poets
18th-century Irish-language poets
Irish highwaymen
Irish outlaws
Irish Jacobites
People from Crossmaglen
18th-century Irish people
1720 births
1750 deaths
People from County Armagh
People executed by Ireland by hanging